En gammal man was released on 28 November 2012 and is a studio album by Mikael Wiehe. In 2013, it was released as an LP.

Track listing
Jag vill bara va en gammal man
Om du saknar nån
Stjärnorna som föll
Med mej blir du aldrig av
Min bäste vän är död
Kärleken tror jag på
Hur tänker du då?
Huset (P'Potemkin)
Se på mej med ljusa ögon
Jag vill tacka dej

Contributors
Mikael Wiehe – vocals, guitar, producer
David Nyström – piano, synthesizer, producer
Ola Gustafsson – guitar, banjo, mandolin, pedal steel
Christer Karlsson – piano, synthesizer
Dan Malmqvist – clarinet, bass clarinet
Lars Holm – accordion
Jerker Odelholm – bass
Måns Block – drums, percussion

Charts

References 

2012 albums
Mikael Wiehe albums